Ozzfest: Second Stage Live is a live recording of Ozzfest 2000.

Track listing
Disc 1
 "Eye For An Eye" - Soulfly
 "Voices" - Disturbed
 "Pushing Me" - Slaves on Dope
 "Suck" - Kittie
 "The Big F*** You" - Primer 55
 "Ode To Clarissa" - Queens of the Stone Age
 "Keep It Clean" - Pitchshifter
 "Mirror's Reflection" - Taproot
 "Pain" - Soulfly
 I Don't Know - Ozzy Osbourne
Disc 2
 "Loco" - Coal Chamber
 "Broken Foundation" - Earth Crisis
 "Organizized" - Powerman 5000
 "Locust Star" - Neurosis
 "Replica" - Fear Factory
 "These Eyes" - Biohazard
 "Attitude" - Sepultura
 "Angel of Death" - Slayer
 "Perry Mason" - Ozzy Osbourne

Albums produced by Tim Palmer
2001 live albums
Ozzfest